is a Japanese manga series written and illustrated by Tamifull. It has been serialized in Shogakukan's MangaONE and Ura Sunday web platforms since August 2018. The manga has been licensed in North America by Viz Media.

Plot

Publication
How Do We Relationship is written and illustrated by Tamifull. It began publication in Shogakukan's MangaONE and Ura Sunday web platforms on August 17, 2018. Shogakukan has compiled its chapters into individual tankōbon volumes. The first volume was released on January 11, 2019. As of August 19, 2022, nine volumes have been published.

In North America, Viz Media announced the English language release of the manga in October 2019. The first volume was released on June 9, 2020.

Volume list

Reception
In 2019, How Do We Relationship? was nominated for the 5th Next Manga Awards in the digital category and placed 13th out of 50 nominees.

Notes

References

Further reading

External links
  
 
 

Japanese webcomics
Romantic comedy anime and manga
Shogakukan manga
Shōjo manga
Slice of life anime and manga
Viz Media manga
Webcomics in print
Yuri (genre) anime and manga